The Tall Ships Challenge is an annual event organized by Tall Ships America alternating in a three year cycle between the Great Lakes, the Pacific and the Atlantic coasts of North America.

The event draws hundreds of thousands of people to witness tall ships from the age of sail and allows participants to interact with the crews of different vessels in friendly rivalries as they race from port to port.

The series began in 2001 on the Great Lakes and saw vessels from six countries and visited seven US and Canadian ports. Since its launch, the series has visited dozens of North American cities, bringing millions of spectators down to the waterfront to experience the tall ships and creating a cumulative economic impact of hundreds of millions of dollars for host communities. It has continued to grow every year and is an eagerly anticipated event in the seaside communities that host the vessels (see, for example Philadelphia's Summer Sail 2007)and beyond. 

Each year, the challenge is designated a Marine Event of National Significance by the US Coast Guard.

See also
American Sail Training Association
Cutty Sark Tall Ships' Race
Sail training
Tall ship

References

Recurring events established in 2001
Sailing festivals
Tall ships
Sports festivals in Canada
Sports festivals in the United States
2001 establishments in North America